Telmatobius intermedius is a species of frog in the family Telmatobiidae.
It is endemic to Peru.
Its natural habitats are subtropical or tropical high-altitude shrubland, subtropical or tropical high-altitude grassland, and rivers.

References

Intermedius
Endemic fauna of Peru
Amphibians of Peru
Amphibians of the Andes
Taxonomy articles created by Polbot
Amphibians described in 1951